Solid State Rhyme is the fourth studio album by Australian singer-songwriter Diesel, released in November 1994. It peaked at number 10 on the ARIA Charts. The album was certified gold in Australia.

"All Come Together", "15 Feet of Snow" and "Get it On" were released as singles.

Track listing
 Chill Pill - 2:14
 Get it On - 3:03
 Love Again - 3:13
 All Come Together (Diesel/Davies) - 4:48
 You - 3:00
 Sacred Cow - 4:10
 Make It Right - 4:43
 Still Thinking About Your Love - 3:08
 15 Feet of Snow - 5:17
 Come If You Dare - 3:40
 Bad Seed - 4:35
 Blur - 4:31
 Time - 4:54

 All tracks written by Diesel except where stated.

Charts

Weekly charts

Year-end charts

Certifications

References

1995 albums
ARIA Award-winning albums
Diesel (musician) albums